James Tatum may refer to:

 Jim Tatum, James M. "Big Jim" Tatum (1913 – 1959), American football and baseball player and coach
 James Tatum (weightlifter) (born 1989), American weightlifter